
This is a list of players who graduated from the Nationwide Tour in 2007. The top 25 players on the Nationwide Tour's money list in 2007 earned their PGA Tour card for 2008.

*PGA Tour rookie for 2008.
#Flanagan received a battlefield promotion to the PGA Tour in 2007 by winning three tournaments on the Nationwide Tour in 2007. On the PGA Tour in 2007, he played in 4 tournaments and made 2 cuts. In the two tournaments that he made the cut in, he finished in a tie for 17th and in a tie for 18th.
T = Tied
Green background indicates the player retained his PGA Tour card for 2009 (won or finished inside the top 125).
Yellow background indicates the player did not retain his PGA Tour card for 2009, but retained conditional status (finished between 126–150).
Red background indicates the player did not retain his PGA Tour card for 2009 (finished outside the top 150).

Winners on the PGA Tour in 2008

Runners-up on the PGA Tour in 2008

See also
2007 PGA Tour Qualifying School graduates

References
All information from here, individual player profiles and golfstats.com.
Money list
Player profiles

Korn Ferry Tour
PGA Tour
Nationwide Tour Graduates
Nationwide Tour Graduates